The Moșna is a right tributary of the river Prut in Romania. It flows into the Prut near Gorban.

References

Rivers of Romania
Rivers of Iași County